Raiamas is a genus of cyprinid freshwater fishes. The majority of the species are from Africa, but R. bola and R. guttatus  are from South and Southeast Asia.

Species 
 Raiamas ansorgii (Boulenger, 1910)
 Raiamas batesii (Boulenger, 1914)
 Raiamas bola (F. Hamilton, 1822) (Trout barb)
 Raiamas buchholzi (W. K. H. Peters, 1876)
 Raiamas christyi (Boulenger, 1920) (Coppernose barb)
 Raiamas guttatus (F. Day, 1870) (Burmese trout)
 Raiamas intermedius (Boulenger, 1915)
 Raiamas kheeli Stiassny, Schelly & Schliewen, 2006
 Raiamas levequei Howes & Teugels, 1989
 Raiamas longirostris (Boulenger, 1902)
 Raiamas moorii (Boulenger, 1900) (Lake Rukwa minnow)
 Raiamas nigeriensis (Daget, 1959)
 Raiamas salmolucius (Nichols & Griscom, 1917)
 Raiamas scarciensis Howes & Teugels, 1989
 Raiamas senegalensis (Steindachner, 1870) (Silver fish)
 Raiamas shariensis (Fowler, 1949)
 Raiamas steindachneri (Pellegrin, 1908)

References
 

 
Taxa named by David Starr Jordan 
Taxonomy articles created by Polbot